Parsian may refer to:
 Parsian Bank, a bank in Iran
 Parsian, Iran, a city in Iran
 Parsian County, an administrative subdivision of Iran
 Parsian, Bandar Abbas, a village in Iran
 Parsian IF, a football club in Stockholms Fotbollförbund
 Farsian (disambiguation)